A.S.D. Chiavari Calcio Caperana was an Italian association football club, based in Caperana, a frazione of Chiavari, Liguria.

Chiavari Caperana last played in Serie D.

History
The club was founded in 1972 as A.S.D. Caperanese. The team was promoted to Eccellenza Liguria in the 2000–01 season after an ascent started in Seconda Categoria in the 1998–99 season.

In the 2009–10 season Caperanese won the national play-offs of Eccellenza Liguria and so was promoted in Serie D.

In summer 2010 the club was renamed A.S.D. Chiavari Calcio Caperana. At the end of the 2013–14 Serie D season it was not admitted to the next edition and folded thereafter.
From May 2015 the club has been refounded as A. S. D. Caperanese 2015 and plays in the first category league L. N. D. Liguria

Colors and badge
The team's colors are green and blue, such as the municipality.

References

External links
Official Site

Football clubs in Liguria
Association football clubs established in 1972
1972 establishments in Italy
Association football clubs disestablished in 2014
2014 disestablishments in Italy
Defunct football clubs in Italy